Reconnaissance Battalion 934 or Gadsar Nahal is the special forces unit or Reconnaissance battalion of the Nahal Brigade. 
The battalion is divided into three companies: the Sayeret/Palsar (Reconnaissance Company), the Palhan (Engineering and Demolitions Company), and the Palnat/Orev (Anti-tank Company). 

Training consists of 4 months boot camp followed by 4 months advanced training and then an additional 4 to 5 months l of specialised training. 

The unit operates on a rotation of 4 months of training followed by 4 months of deployment. The training is conducted at the unit's headquarters, Mahane 21, while security deployment is conducted in the West Bank areas of Jenin and Nablus. 

The unit has also participated in many operations in multiple cities in the West Bank, the Gaza Strip, the Golan Heights, and Lebanon. 

The premiere company is the Palsar, which specializes in counter-terror, intelligence gathering, hand-to-hand combat and tunnel warfare. This "Palsar" unit is considered one of the most skilled Sayeret units due to its manpower, which is drawn primarily from Israeli Kibbutzniks, Moshavniks and foreign volunteers. The Palhan is especially decorated for their role in the Second Intifada. The unit has 14-month training period which includes 7 months of basic and advanced training, and 7 months of special forces training.

External links

Special forces of Israel
Counterterrorist organizations
Military units and formations established in 1983

he:חטיבת הנח"ל#סיירת נח"ל